Operation Mobilisation is a Christian missionary organisation founded by George Verwer to mobilise young people to live and share the Gospel of Jesus. OM, (Operation Mobilisation) , started in Mexico and had spread to Europe and India by 1963.

OM currently has 6,800 people working in 118 countries around the world, seeking to "see vibrant communities of Jesus followers among the least reached". OM's core values are knowing and glorifying God, living in submission to God's Word, being people of grace & integrity, serving sacrificially, loving & valuing people, evangelising the world, reflecting the diversity of the body of Christ, global intercession, and esteeming the church. They accomplish these core values through church planting, evangelism, relief and development, justice, and mentoring and discipleship.

History 
George Verwer, OM's founder and leader until 2003, received a Gospel of John from a local woman while still in high school in the 1950s. In 1955, Verwer became a Christian at a Billy Graham meeting at Madison Square Garden, and made a commitment to global missions and spreading God's Word on a massive scale.

Operation Mobilisation started in 1957 when Walter Borchard, Dale Rhoton and George Verwer traveled to Mexico to distribute Christian literature and Gospels. The Gospels were very important to the men and the beginning of OM's long history. The trip in 1957 was the first of three summer trips to Mexico. By 1960, the men turned their attention to Europe, focusing on mobilising the national churches to global missions. Verwer's vision for the global mission was that leadership would come from the local Christian community, wherever possible, rather than from foreigners (Randall 2008).

In Summer 1962 OM's first short-term missions teams moved into Europe, coming from the UK, Spain, Germany, Netherlands, Switzerland, the US and elsewhere. In the summer of 1963 more than 2,000 people blanketed Europe to encourage Christians and to carry God's Word throughout the continent and find creative ways of getting it behind the Iron Curtain. OM teams were also starting in India and the Middle East in 1963 (Randall 2008).

OM and Verwer's vision for spreading the Gospel expanded to the seas with the purchase of the ship MV Logos in October 1970. Thereafter OM expanded its ships ministry with the MV Doulos, MV Logos II and MV Logos Hope. Currently only the latter ship is operating, with the previous three having been retired.

Back in Europe, summer conferences were continuing but the number of participants was dwindling. In late 1987, a renewed vision for reaching Europe was born, which led to the “Love Europe” outreaches that started in July 1989, just prior to the fall of the Iron Curtain. OM planned for 5,000 young people from 50 nations to participate; in fact, about 7,000 from 76 nations came. With this first “Love Europe” conference, the vision of OM – birthed in Europe – had been renewed (Randall 2008). OM's operations in Europe today includes ministry in more than 30 countries.

On 7 March 2013, OM appointed a new international director, only the third in its nearly 56-year history. Lawrence Tong, from Singapore, took over the OM leadership from Peter Maiden, from the UK, who had served and led in the role since 2003. Lawrence, who has served as director of OM's ship Logos II, assumed responsibility on 1 September 2013.

OM Ships
Currently, OM Ships operates one ship serving destinations around the world, the MV Logos Hope.  Their first ship, MV Logos, ran aground on rocks off Tierra del Fuego, Chile, in atrocious weather conditions in 1988. Although the ship could not be saved, not a single crew member was lost or injured. The skeletal hulk of the ship is still visible and has become something of a tourist attraction over the years. Over a 17-year period, more than 6.5 million people visited MV Logos during 408 ports of call in 108 countries. Later in 1988, the former Antonio Lazaro became the MV Logos II, which was retired in July 2008. OM's third ship, the MV Doulos, previously held the record for the oldest ocean-going ship still in service. She was retired at the end of 2009. MV Logos Hope was launched into service in 2009. Twice the size of the MV Doulos, it provides much greater capacity to serve communities.

The OM ships have visited port cities throughout the world, supplying literature, encouraging cross-cultural understanding, training young people for more effective life and service, providing relief, and sharing a message of hope in God wherever there is an opportunity. Since 1970, OM's ships have visited 480 different ports in 151 countries and territories around the globe.

In total, over 45 million visitors have come aboard to purchase from the selection of 5,000 titles available in the ships' floating bookstores. Titles cover a wide range of subjects, such as science, sports, hobbies, cookery, the arts, philosophy, medicine and children's books, as well as faith and life. The books have been carefully chosen to be of interest to every member of the family, and with the educational, social and moral needs of the local community in mind. Books are on offer at a fraction of their retail value, and, while in certain ports, books are also donated.

See also
Teenstreet, an annual international week-long congress for Christian teenagers presented by OM.

References

Bibliography
Randall, Ian. Spiritual Revolution, The Story of OM, Authentic, 2008.

External links

Evangelical parachurch organizations
Christian missions
Christian missionary societies
Christian organizations established in 1957
Charities based in Shropshire
Christian organizations